Slavyanka is an urban locality (an urban-type settlement) and the administrative center of Khasansky District of Primorsky Krai, Russia, located on the opposite side of the Amur Bay as seen from Vladivostok. Population:

History
Slavyanka was founded during the settlement of the coast of southern Primorye in the 1850s–1860s, when the Russian government sought to gain a foothold in the region. The signing of the Treaty of Aigun in 1858 and of the Treaty of Beijing in 1860 established the border between Russia and China along the Ussuri River across Lake Khanka.

The bay on which Slavyanka stands was shown in the English charts under the name of Port Bruce; other sources also referred to it as Bruce Harbor or Bruce Bay. Slavyanka itself was founded in 1889. On January 4, 1926, Slavyansky Selsoviet within Posyetsky District was established, of which Slavyanka became the administrative center. On April 29, 1943, Slavyanka was granted urban-type settlement status.

The intensive development of Slavyanka started in the 1970s, when a shipyard was built here.

Transportation
The settlement is connected with Vladivostok by road, by railway, and by sea.

References

Notes

Sources
Приморский крайисполком. "Приморский край.  Административно-территориальное деление на 1 января 1968 г." Дальневосточное книжное издательство. Владивосток, 1968.  Стр. 23.

Urban-type settlements in Primorsky Krai
Port cities and towns in Russia
Populated places established in 1889